is a railway station on the Tsugaru Railway Line in the town of Nakadomari, Aomori, Japan, operated by the private railway operator Tsugaru Railway Company.

Lines

Station layout
The station has one ground-level side platform serving a single bidirectional line. The station is unattended.

History
Ōzawanai Station was opened on October 4, 1930. The station building was reconstructed in 1967.

Surrounding area
 Ōzawanai Reservoir

See also
 List of railway stations in Japan

External links

 

Railway stations in Aomori Prefecture
Tsugaru Railway Line
Nakadomari, Aomori
Railway stations in Japan opened in 1930